In enzymology, a galactosylacylglycerol O-acyltransferase is an enzyme that catalyzes the chemical reaction

acyl-[acyl-carrier-protein] + sn-3-D-galactosyl-sn-2-acylglycerol  [acyl-carrier-protein] + D-galactosyldiacylglycerol

Thus, the two substrates of this enzyme are [[acyl-[acyl-carrier-protein]]] and sn-3-D-galactosyl-sn-2-acylglycerol, whereas its two products are acyl-carrier-protein and D-galactosyldiacylglycerol.

This enzyme belongs to the family of transferases, specifically those acyltransferases transferring groups other than aminoacyl groups.  The systematic name of this enzyme class is acyl-[acyl-carrier-protein]:D-galactosylacylglycerol O-acyltransferase. Other names in common use include acyl-acyl-carrier protein: lysomonogalactosyldiacylglycerol, acyltransferase, and acyl-ACP:lyso-MGDG acyltransferase.  This enzyme participates in glycerolipid metabolism.

References

 

EC 2.3.1
Enzymes of unknown structure